Zhu Yu is a Chinese professional  football player who plays as a goalkeeper for Wuhan Jianghan University. She studied in Jianghan University.

References

Living people
1997 births
Chinese women's footballers
China women's international footballers
Footballers at the 2020 Summer Olympics
Olympic footballers of China
Women's association football goalkeepers